James Gunn (senator) (1753–1801) was a U.S. Senator from Georgia from 1789 to 1801. Senator Gunn may also refer to:

James Gunn (congressman) (1843–1911), Idaho State Senate
Julien Gunn (1877–1948), Virginia State Senate
Levi J. Gunn (1830–1916), Massachusetts State Senate
Otis B. Gunn (1828–1901), Kansas State Senate
Rick Gunn (born 1958), North Carolina State Senate